Mexican Restaurants, Inc. is a Houston, Texas-based restaurant company.

As of 2015, they have 46 company operated locations, 10 franchised and one licensed.

The company operates five different concepts: Casa Ole, Überrito Fresh Mex (formerly Mission Burrito), Monterey's Little Mexico, Tortuga Mexican Kitchen and Crazy Jose's. The company operates restaurants in Texas, Oklahoma and Louisiana.

References

External links

Restaurant franchises
Mexican-American culture in Texas
Mexican restaurants
Restaurants in Houston